Melling is a civil parish and a village in Sefton, Merseyside, England.  It contains 11 buildings that are recorded in the National Heritage List for England as designated listed buildings.   Of these, one is listed at Grade II*, the middle of the three grades, and the others are at Grade II, the lowest grade.  Apart from the village of Melling, the parish is rural.  The listed buildings include houses, farms and associated buildings, a church and associated structures, and an ancient cross.

Key

Buildings

References

Citations

Sources

Listed buildings in Merseyside
Lists of listed buildings in Merseyside